Andrei Valeryevich Ushenin (born 1 December 1983) is a Russian former footballer. On 3 November 2008, in a league game against FC Krylia Sovetov Samara, Shinnik goalkeeper Sergei Pesyakov was sent off with 15 minutes to go. Shinnik made all three allowed substitutions at that point, and Ushenin had to become a goalkeeper. He allowed two goals in a 0–4 loss.

External links
  Player page on the official FC Shinnik Yaroslavl website
 

1983 births
Living people
People from Maykop
Russian footballers
Russia under-21 international footballers
FC Kuban Krasnodar players
FC Shinnik Yaroslavl players
Russian Premier League players
FC Baltika Kaliningrad players
FC Chernomorets Novorossiysk players
FC Luch Vladivostok players
Association football defenders
FC Spartak-UGP Anapa players
Sportspeople from Adygea